Rufina Bazlova (born 1990) is a Belarusian artist based in Prague. She gained international renown for her 2020 series The History of Belarusian Vyzhyvanka, which uses the traditional embroidery craft of Vyshyvanka to depict the protests in Belarus.

Biography 
Rufina Bazlova comes from the large city of Grodno in western Belarus. She studied in Plzeň and has worked in Prague as a set designer and performance artist. She received her master's diploma in illustration and graphic design from the University of West Bohemia in Pilsen in 2015. Bazlova moved to Prague and completed a bachelor's degree in scenography at the Academy of Performing Arts in 2020.

Work 
In August 2020, thousands of people joined the protests against Alexander Lukashenko's election, including many artists. In response to the Belarusian election campaign, Rufina Bazlova designed the first protest embroideries and posted her work on Instagram. Bazlova uses traditional Belarusian embroidery to create critical art. The figures, which look like pictograms, are in the national colors of white and red of the Belarusian opposition. The technique of applying red thread to white fabric with cross stitching invokes the Vyshyvanka technique, a local folklore. The embroideries, which at first seem harmless, become digital narratives and thus a testimony to the Belarusian mass protests.

Since the early Middle Ages, Vyshyvanka, the East Slavic patterns in Russia, Ukraine and Belarus, have been embroidered on clothing. Motifs of that time were about love, the sun or protection against evil spirits. Bazlova's depictions include tanks, helicopters, fleeing people and swastikas and cockroaches dumping trucks. Among protesters in Belarus, the cockroach symbol is code for President Alexander Lukashenko, who has brutally quelled mass protests since the allegedly rigged presidential election in August 2020. Bazlova's art provides insight into the female-driven democratic resistance in Belarus.

Rufina Bazlova creates her designs digitally; very few motifs are actually produced, as production would be too time-consuming. The digitally processed Vyshyvanka document the ongoing history of the Belarusian uprising. According to Bazlova, each tableau is associated with an actual event from 2020. Her Serie The History of Belarusian Vyzhyvanka has become international notoriety; Vyzhyvanka is a play on words from the Belarusian words "embroidery" and "survival." Vyshyvanka means "embroidered shirt." Vyzhyvats means "survival". In the embroidered comic Zhenokol (Feminnature) Rufina Bazlova presented themes on feminism in folk tradition.Together with Sofia Tocar, Bazlova founded Framed in Belarus, a social art project that addresses the situation of political prisoners. On the occasion of the Charlemagne Prize award in 2022 Rufina Bazlova exhibited current works in Aachen.

In August 2022, Ukrainian President Volodymyr Zelenskyy wore a shirt designed by Bazlova at the opening of Independence Week. Rufina Bazlova designed the New Year's card for the German Federal Foreign Office in 2022.

Awards 
 2010: The main prize in the international Young Package Award in comics category
 2021: The second prize on III Biennale of Artistic Textiles in Poznan

Exhibitions (selection) 
 Solo exhibitions
 2023: Such a Minsk flag installation Das Minsk Potsdam
 2022: Outpost Kunstverein Dresden
 2022: Vyžyvanka pro.story Zlín
 2022: Ein Roter Faden Suermondt-Ludwig Museum Aachen
 2021: Nici z demokracji Galeria Browarna Łowicz
 2021: The History of Belarussian Vyzhyvanka UCLA Library, Los Angeles
 Group exhibitions
 2023: Appunti su Questo Tempo CasermArcheologica, Sansepolcro
 2022/23: Politics Museum of Contemporary Art in Kraków, Kraków
 2022/23: What is the Proper Way to Display a Flag? Weserburg Museum für Moderne Kunst (Modern art museum) Bremen
 2022/23: Manifest yourself Künstlerhaus Bethanien, Berlin
 2022: The Medium is the Message: Flags and Banners The Wende Museum at The Armory, Culver City, USA
 2021: Demo Mode Society Galerie ASPN in Leipzig
 2021: Patchwork Le Radar, Bayeux

External links 
 Website Rufina Bazlova
 The History of Belarusian Vyzhyvanka
 Projekt Framed in Belarus

References 

Living people
21st-century Belarusian women
Belarusian human rights activists
21st-century Belarusian artists
1990 births